Hydropionea oblectalis is a moth in the family Crambidae. It was described by George Duryea Hulst in 1886. It is found in North America, where it has been recorded from Arizona.

References

Moths described in 1886
Spilomelinae